Valfrid Ernhard "Poju" Nykänen (8 January 1894 – February 1918), was a Finnish World War I fighter pilot of the Imperial Russian Air Service. He was the first Finnish fighter pilot.

Nykänen graduated from the Kazan Military Academy in 1915 and served the Imperial Russian Army on the Western Front in Poland. Following training at Sevastopol he became a fighter pilot in May 1917. As a Nieuport pilot Nykänen flew on the Caucasus Front with four aerial victories. Nykänen claimed he was awarded with Golden Sword of St. George but any records of Nykänen's award are not found.

As the Finnish Civil War burst out in January 1918, Nykänen returned Finland and fought for the White Guards on the Satakunta front. He was captured by the Red Guards and shot in February 1918.

Nykänen was also known as a talented athlete. He was a reserve gymnast for the Finnish silver medal team at the 1912 Summer Olympics.

References 

1894 births
1918 deaths
People from Kotka
People from Viipuri Province (Grand Duchy of Finland)
Russian World War I pilots
Finnish aviators
People of the Finnish Civil War (White side)
Finnish male artistic gymnasts
People executed by Finland by firing squad
Sportspeople from Kymenlaakso